Theater Alliance is a non-profit professional theater in Washington, DC, professionally incorporated in 2000 with the goal of producing work that would illuminate the experiences, philosophies and interests of DC's diverse population. That goal was furthered in 2002, when Theater Alliance moved from its home at the Capitol Hill Arts Workshop to become the sole theater-in-residence at the H Street Playhouse. Once the H Street Playhouse closed, Theater Alliance moved to Southeast DC, where it has been the theater-in-residence at the Anacostia Playhouse since 2013.

Theater Alliance was under the leadership of Producing Artistic Director Colin Hovde from 2011 - 2018. In July 2018, actor, director, and teaching artist, Raymond O. Caldwell was named Producing Artistic Director.  It is now in its 18th season.

Current and Recent Productions

Season 15: 2017 - 2018 

 Word Becomes Flesh by Marc Bamuthi Joseph
 The Word Becomes Action Festival
 The Raid by Idris Goodwin
 Flood City by Gabrielle Reisman

Season 14: 2016 - 2017 

 Still Life with Rocket by Mollye Maxner
 Mnemonic by Complicite
 The Planet Earth Arts New Play Festival
 Black Nativity by Langston Hughes
 brownsville song (b-side for tray) by Kimber Lee

Season 13: 2015 - 2016 

 Night Falls on the Blue Planet by Kathleen Akerley
 Black Nativity by Langston Hughes
 for colored girls who have considered suicide / when the rainbow is enuf by Ntozake Shange
 Word Becomes Flesh by Marc Bamuthi Joseph
 Going to a Place Where You Already Are by Bekah Brunstetter

Season 12: 2014 - 2015 

 Spark by Caridad Svich
 Black Nativity by Langston Hughes
 Dontrell, Who Kissed the Sea by Nathan Alan Davis
 Occupied Territories, by Mollye Maxner and Nancy Bannon

Awards 
Overall, the company has earned more than 80 Helen Hayes Award nominations and 13 Helen Hayes Awards, including:

 2017 - Outstanding Ensemble in a Play, Word Becomes Flesh
 2017 - Outstanding Direction of a Play, Word Becomes Flesh
 2017 - Outstanding Play, Word Becomes Flesh
 2016 - Outstanding Choreography in a Play, Occupied Territories
 2015 - Outstanding Ensemble in a Play, Black Nativity
 2015 - Outstanding Musical, Black Nativity
 2015 - Outstanding Director of a Play, The Wonderful World of Dissocia
 2015 - Outstanding Play, The Wonderful World of Dissocia

References 

Members of the Cultural Alliance of Greater Washington
Theatre companies in Washington, D.C.
Theatre in Washington, D.C.
Theatres in Washington, D.C.